Swimming clubs emerged with the development of swimming as a competitive sport in the early 1800s in England.  By 1880, when the first national governing body, the Amateur Swimming Association, was formed, there were already over 300 regional clubs in operation across England.

The more notable swim clubs often have association with past Olympic athletes and future contenders, and vice versa.

Notable swim clubs around the world include:

Australia
Australian Paralympic Swim Team
Australian Swim Team
Bondi Icebergs Club
Commercial Swimming Club
Melbourne Vicentre
Randwick & Coogee Amateur Swimming Club

United Kingdom
 City of Southampton Swimming Club
 Durham University Swimming Club
 Nottingham Leander Swimming Club
 Portsmouth Northsea Swimming Club
 West London Penguin Swimming and Water Polo Club

United States
Aquabombers
Canyons Aquatic Club, founded in 1978, located in Santa Clarita, California
Cincinnati Marlins
Industry Hills Aquatic Club
Irvine Novaquatics
Mission Viejo Nadadores
New Trier Swim Club
North Baltimore Aquatic Club
The Woodlands Swim Team, founded in 1975, based in Woodlands, Texas

See also
List of 10-meter diving platforms
List of Australian surf lifesaving clubs

References

Lists of sports clubs
Clubs